The Omnibus Judgeship Act of 1978 is a major law in the United States that expanded the Federal Judiciary by adding 117 district judges and 35 circuit judges.

References 

1978 in American law
1978 in American politics
95th United States Congress
February 1978 events in the United States
July 1977 events in the United States
October 1978 events in the United States